Sareyn County is in Ardabil province, Iran. The capital of the county is the city of Sareyn. At the 2006 census, the region's population (as Sareyn District of Ardabil County) was 17,197 in 3,937 households. The following census in 2011 counted 18,231 people in 5,214 households, by which time the district had been separated from the county to become Sareyn County. At the 2016 census, the county's population was 18,200 in 5,338 households.

Administrative divisions

The population history and structural changes of Sareyn County's administrative divisions over three consecutive censuses are shown in the following table. The latest census shows two districts, four rural districts, and one city.

References

 

Counties of Ardabil Province